Fortnox Arena is an arena in Växjö for floorball. Fortnox Arena was officially opened in September 2012.

References

2012 in Sweden
Sports venues in Växjö
Sports venues completed in 2012